China competed at the 2022 World Games held in Birmingham, United States from 7 to 17 July 2022. Athletes representing China won nine gold medals, four silver medals and one bronze medal. The country finished in 10th place in the medal table.

Medalists

Invitational sports

Competitors
The following is the list of number of competitors in the Games.

Air sports

China competed in drone racing.

Bowling

China competed in bowling.

Finswimming

China won ten medals in finswimming.

Korfball

China finished in 5th place in the korfball tournament.

Squash

China competed in squash.

Wushu

China won four gold medals in wushu.

References

Nations at the 2022 World Games
2022
World Games